The Sandlings Walk is a long-distance path in Suffolk, England. It runs 91.6km through the Suffolk Sandling that used to stretch from the outskirts of Ipswich to Southwold which is an area of lowland heath, Britain's rarest wildlife habitat, and the Suffolk Coast and Heaths Area of Outstanding Natural Beauty.

See also
 Long-distance footpaths in the UK
 Suffolk Coast Path

References

External links

Information and maps at Suffolk Coast and Heaths

Footpaths in Suffolk
Long-distance footpaths in England